Lieutenant General Sir Robert John Hayman-Joyce  (born 16 October 1940) is a former Master-General of the Ordnance.

Military career
Hayman Joyce was commissioned into the 11th Hussars in 1963.

He was appointed Commanding Officer of the Royal Hussars in 1980. He then went on to be Commander of the Royal Armoured Corps within British Army of the Rhine in 1983 and Deputy Commandant of the Royal Military College of Science in 1987.

He was made Director of the UK Tank Programme in 1988 and Director-General Fighting Vehicles in 1989. He was promoted to Director Royal Armoured Corps in 1992 and Military Secretary in 1994, before becoming Master-General of the Ordnance in 1995. He was appointed Deputy Chief of Defence Procurement in 1997.  He retired in 1999.

He was also Colonel Commandant of the Royal Armoured Corps from 1995 to 1999.

Retirement
In retirement he was a non-executive director of Alvis plc from 1999 to 2004 and has been non-executive chairman of Raytheon Systems Ltd since 2000.

He was awarded an honorary Doctor of Science from Cranfield University in 1998.

References

 

|-
 

|-

1940 births
British Army lieutenant generals
Knights Commander of the Order of the Bath
Commanders of the Order of the British Empire
Deputy Lieutenants of Monmouthshire
11th Hussars officers
Royal Hussars officers
Living people